Aaron Kanter is a professional poker player from Lodi, California.

Kanter's first major success in poker came at the 2005 World Series of Poker Main Event, where he finished in 4th place and earned $2,000,000. He has since cashed in several different poker tournaments in the United States.

On May 11, 2008, Kanter won the opening event of the 4th Full Tilt Online Poker Series, a $216 buy in No-Limit Hold'em tournament. He topped a field of 2,573 players to win the $94,403 1st place prize.

Kanter's most recent success was finishing in 3rd place in the $1,500 No Limit Hold'em event at the 2008 World Series of Poker, which earned him $258,862.

As of 2008, his total live tournament winnings exceed $2,400,000. His 7 cashes at the WSOP account for $2,314,886 of those winnings.

See also
World Series of Poker Circuit events
World Series of Poker Tournament of Champions
2005 World Series of Poker Results
2008 World Series of Poker results

References

American poker players
People from Lodi, California
Living people
Year of birth missing (living people)